Desaparecido is the first full-length studio album from Italian rock band Litfiba, though the band had previously released five EPs or singles. It is the first part of the "Trilogy of power". The music is much British new wave-influenced, though the lyrics are in Italian.

Track listing
"Eroi nel vento" – 3:47
"La preda" – 2:52
"Lulù  e Marlene" – 4:43
"Istanbul" – 5:44
"Tziganata" – 2:56
"Pioggia di luce" – 4:30
"Desaparecido" – 3:25
"Guerra" – 5:29

Personnel
Piero Pelù - vocals
Ghigo Renzulli - guitars
Ringo de Palma - drums
Antonio Aiazzi – keyboards
Gianni Maroccolo - bass
Additional keyboards by Francesco Magnelli

Produced by Alberto Pirelli

External links

Litfiba albums
1985 albums
Italian-language albums